KXTJ-LP is a low-power FM radio station serving the northwest side of San Antonio, Texas. It is known as Classic Hits 96.9 with a format of 1980s, and 1990s music.

References

External links
Company Website

XTJ-LP
XTJ-LP
Radio stations established in 2015
2015 establishments in Texas